Burke Lake is a  freshwater reservoir in Fairfax Station, Fairfax County, Virginia, United States. It is contained within Burke Lake Park, a Fairfax County public park owned by the Fairfax County Park Authority (FCPA). Burke Lake is formed by a dam on South Run, a tributary stream of the Potomac River.

Fairfax County permits visitors to use the lake for fishing, electric-motor, and paddle/row boating. The lake has  of fishing shoreline, three fishing bulkheads at the state game area, a fishing pier, a public & marina & public launch ramps, and a boat launching dock. Both the fishing bulkheads and the fishing pier are accessible to persons with disabilities. Swimming is prohibited. A  trail surrounds the lake starting at the marina parking lot.  In 2017, Burke opened a new 64-station lighted driving range with 24 covered and heated stations. The new amenities will accommodate practice and classes year-round at Burke Lake Golf Academy. A rentable area with indoor seating is also available for private functions and parties.

Burke Lake is owned by the Virginia Department of Game and Inland Fisheries (VDGIF).

See also 
 Burke Lake Park

References

External links 
 Virginia Department of Game and Inland Fisheries Site for Burke Lake
  Burke Lake at Wikimapia
 

Reservoirs in Virginia
Potomac River watershed
Lakes of Fairfax County, Virginia
Protected areas of Fairfax County, Virginia